Lavarestan (also Romanized as Lāvarestān; also known as Lawar-i-stūn) is a village in Bala Deh Rural District, Beyram District, Larestan County, Fars Province, Iran. At the 2006 census, its population was 404, in 92 families.

References 

Populated places in Larestan County